The 1939 UC Santa Barbara Gauchos football team represented Santa Barbara State during the 1939 college football season.

1939 was the inaugural year for the California Collegiate Athletic Association (CCAA). Santa Barbara State was one of four charter members of the conference, along with Fresno State Normal School, San Diego State College and San Jose State College. The Gauchos were led by sixth-year head coach Theodore "Spud" Harder and played home games at La Playa Stadium in Santa Barbara, California. They finished the season with a record of five wins, four losses and one tie (5–4–1, 1–2 CCAA).

Schedule

Notes

References

Santa Barbara State
UC Santa Barbara Gauchos football seasons
Santa Barbara State Gauchos football